Fahmida Nabi (born 4 January 1966) is a Bangladeshi singer. She usually vocalizes classical and modern-style songs. She also sang songs of Rabindra Sangeet and Nazrul Geeti genre. She won Bangladesh National Film Award for Best Female Playback Singer for her performance in the film Aha! (2007). She also received Channel i Performance Award (2008) and the Meril-Prothom Alo Award (2008). She served as a judge for the reality television music show CloseUp 1. She is an ambassador of Bangladesh Center for Communication Programs (BCCP).

Background and family 
Nabi was born to Mahmudun Nabi & Rashida Chowdhury. She has 2 sisters named Samina Chowdhury & Tanzida Nabi and has 1 brother named Ridwan Nabi Pancham. Nabi was married to Zainul Alam till his death in 2011 and has a daughter named Farkhanda Anmola Alam.

Career

Nabi's solo career started in 1979 and has spanned over three decades. She sings primarily classical and modern Bengali songs. Besides that, she sings Rabindra Sangeet and Nazrul Sangeet. Her first album is Tumi Tulonahina. On 15 January 2011, she released a solo album titled Akash O Shamudra Aupar, which features 10 songs written and tuned by  Selim Al Deen. Her first duet album entitled Ek Mutho Gaan-1 (released in 2006) was recorded with Bappa Mazumder. Fahmida Nabi and Bappa Mazumder's second studio album Ek Mutho Gaan-2 was released on the Valentine's Day in 2010. Fahmida Nabi's Rabindra Sangeet album Amar Bela Je Jay was a classic hit.

Discography

Mixed and solo albums

Notable songs
 Meghla Mon 
 Lukochuri Lukochuri Golpo
  Tumi Ki Shei Tumi
 Shada Kalo
 Akash Khule Boshe Achi
 Badoler Dintare
 Monta tomar
 Ami Akash Hobo
 Ichcheri batashe
 Fele Elam
 Bhul Kore Bhalobesechhi
 Ek Mutho Gaan

Other interests
Nabi is one of the judges of CloseUp1, a reality TV show on NTV (Bangladesh) from 2005 to 2013. She runs a voice modulation institution named "Karigori" since 2007 and works as voice grooming facilitator for that institution. Fahmida Nabi is an ambassador of Bangladesh Center for Communication Programs (BCCP). She 
is a regular columnist at Bangla Tribune, a very popular on-line newspaper in Bangladesh.

Awards

Bangladesh National Film Award (2007)
Bangladesh National Film Award (2007) organized by ministry of information. Chief Adviser Dr. Fakhruddin Ahmed presented the awards at the Bangladesh- China Friendship Conference Centre on 23 October 2008. Nabi won the National Film Award as the Best Female Playback Singer in 2007 for her song "Lukochuri Lukochuri Golpo" in Bengali Film AHA.

The Lux Channel i Performance Award 2008
The Lux Channel i Performance Award 2008 was held with glitz and glamour. The star-studded affair took place in Sharjah, United Arab Emirates on 14 November 2008. A group of 65 celebrities attend the event, which was held at the Sharjah Cricket Stadium. Fahmida nabi awarded Best female singer on that function.

The Diamond World-Rtv Star Award-2014
The Diamond World-Rtv Star Award-2014 was held 8 March 2015, honouring the best of Rtv's programmes from 1 January to 31 December  2014. Fahmida Nabi got Best Female Singer of the year for her outstanding performance through the year.

Meril Prothom Alo Awards (2007)
Meril Prothom Alo Awards or Prothom Alo Awards is an annual Bangladeshi awards ceremony honouring cinematic achievements in Bangladeshi Film Industry. the awards are given everyyear at the Bangabandhu International Conference Center (BICC). Meril Prothom Alo Awards is Bangladesh's equivalent to America's Academy Awards. Fahmida Nabi got best singer (Female) award 2007 for her song lukochuri golpo from movie Aha!

Citycell-Channel i Music Awards 
The biggest award ceremony of Bangladeshi music, the 9th Citycell-Channel i Music Awards was held at the Al-Ahli stadium in Qatar's capital, Doha. Combining critics' choice and popular choice, a total of 18 awards will be given in various categories, including Rabindra Sangeet, Nazrul Sangeet, classical, folk, modern, film, band and fusion music, along with music direction, lyrics, cover design and music video. Fahmida Nabi also received Award for Best singer(Modern Song) in 9th Citycell Channel-i Music Award. She has received Best Singer (Modern Song) Award once again in 2022.

Others Award
 Bangladesh Journalist Association Award 2006 for The Best Female Singer.
 BBC Popular Singer Award 2005.
 Bangladesh Film Journalist Association Award 2006 for The Best Female Singer.
 Bangladesh Journalist Association Award 2006 for The Best Female Singer.

References

Living people
21st-century Bangladeshi women singers
21st-century Bangladeshi singers
Best Female Playback Singer National Film Award (Bangladesh) winners
Best Female Singer Bachsas Award winners
Best Female Singer Meril-Prothom Alo Award winners
Laser Vision artists
20th-century Bangladeshi women singers
20th-century Bangladeshi singers
1966 births